Ruth Hoffmann may refer to:
 Ruth Hubbard  Hoffmann (1924–2016), American biologist
 Ruth Rosekrans Hoffman (1926–2007), American artist and illlustrator